Willy Gepts (March 11, 1922 – January 31, 1991) was a Belgian pathologist and diabetes researcher. He worked from 1965 as a professor of pathology at the Université Libre de Bruxelles and later at the newly founded Dutch-speaking Vrije Universiteit Brussel. With his research on pathological anatomy of the islets of Langerhans in the pancreas, he made important contributions to force up today view that the referred to as type 1 diabetes, type of diabetes mellitus is an autoimmune disease.

Life
W. Gepts was born in Antwerp and graduated in medicine at Université Libre de Bruxelles (ULB), from which he graduated in 1946. He specialized in pathology and devoted himself (next to his clinical work) to the study of morphology. His focus lay on the pancreas islets in various diseases, both in patients and in animals. He developed a microscopic observations method to quantify the number of islets of Langerhans. He thus succeeded in determining the various forms of diabetes mellitus. He was able to show here is that the defined as type 1 diabetes that is characterized by a marked decrease in the number of islands. On the basis of these results, he made his 1957 dissertation.

At the newly founded Dutch-language section of the Université Libre de Bruxelles 1965 he was appointed Professor of Pathology. Four years later, he became head of the Department of Pathology of the Brugmann University Hospital in Brussels. Along with other professors of the ULB he campaigned for the establishment of an independent Dutch-speaking university in Brussels. This happened eventually, when, in 1970, the Vrije Universiteit Brussel was established. Between 1970 and 1980 he taught there and continued his research on pathological anatomy of the pancreas, a laboratory for experimental pathology a. In addition, he was from 1974 to 1979 Vice-Rector of the University. He was also committed to the development of the newly created School of Medicine.

W. Gepts was married and the father of four children. He died in 1991 in his hometown.

References

 Daniel Pipeleers, Pierre Lefèbvre: Obituary: Willy Gepts 1922–1991. In: Diabetologia. 34/1991. Springer, S. 847, 
 Willy Gepts (11.3.1922 bis January 31, 1991). In: Verhandlungen der Deutschen Gesellschaft für Pathologie. Band 75. Gustav Fischer Verlag, Stuttgart 1991, S. 591–598
 Edwin A. M. Gale: The Discovery of Type 1 Diabetes. In: Diabetes. 50/2001. American Diabetes Association, S. 217–226,

External links 

 Daniel Pipeleers: Key Figures in the History of Diabetes: Willy Gepts (1922–1991). In: Diabetologia. 48(7)/2005. Titelseite und Biographie (englisch)
 Vrije Universiteit Brussel: Willy Gepts (1922–1991) (niederländisch, mit Bild)

1922 births
1991 deaths
Belgian pathologists
Free University of Brussels (1834–1969) alumni
Academic staff of Vrije Universiteit Brussel
Physicians from Antwerp
Academic staff of the Free University of Brussels (1834–1969)